The 1948 United States presidential election in South Carolina took place on November 2, 1948, as part of the 1948 United States presidential election. State voters chose eight electors to the Electoral College, which selected the president and vice president.

South Carolina was won by States' Rights Democratic candidate Strom Thurmond, defeating the Democratic candidate, incumbent President Harry S. Truman, and New York Governor Thomas E. Dewey.

Thurmond won his native state by a margin of 47.77 points, making him the first third-party candidate to carry the state since Southern Democrat John C. Breckinridge in 1860.

Background
For six decades South Carolina had been a one-party state dominated by the Democratic Party. The Republican Party had been moribund due to the disfranchisement of blacks and the complete absence of other support bases as the Palmetto State completely lacked upland or German refugee whites opposed to secession. Between 1900 and 1944, no Republican presidential candidate ever obtained more than seven percent of the total presidential vote – a vote which in 1924 reached as low as 6.6% of the total voting-age population (or approximately 15% of the voting-age white population).

This absolute loyalty to the Democratic Party – so strong that even Catholic Al Smith in 1928 received over 90% of South Carolina's limited vote total at the same time as five former Confederate states voted for Herbert Hoover – began to break down with Henry A. Wallace's appointment as Vice-President and the 1943 Detroit race riots. The northern left wing of the Democratic Party became as a result of this riot committed to restoring black political rights, a policy vehemently opposed by most Southern Democrats as an infringement upon "states' rights". Tension widened much further when new President Harry Truman, himself a Southerner from Missouri, had described to him a number of horrifying lynchings and racial violence against black veterans, most crucially the beating and blinding of Isaac Woodard three hours after being discharged from the army. Truman, previously viewed as no friend of civil rights, came to believe that racial violence against blacks in the South was a threat to the United States' image abroad and its ability to win the Cold War against the radically egalitarian rhetoric of Communism.

The result was a major civil rights plan titled To Secure These Rights a year later, and a civil rights plank in the 1948 Democratic platform. Southern Democrats were enraged by these proposals and thus sought to form a "States' Rights" Democratic ticket, which would replace Truman as the official Democratic nominee. In South Carolina, Dixiecrats completely controlled the situation and achieved this, so that Thurmond and Mississippi Governor Fielding Wright were listed as the official "Democratic" nominees.

Vote
Significant opposition to Thurmond came from the poor whites of the industrial upcountry, who rejected the Dixiecrats' opposition to public works and labor regulation. However, sufficiently few of these poorer whites voted that Thurmond was able to easily carry South Carolina, winning 44 of the state's 46 counties and over 71 percent of the total presidential vote. Thurmond exceeded 72 percent in all but 12 counties, and passed 90 percent in 10.

Results

Results by county

Notes

References

1948
South Carolina
1948 South Carolina elections